Roméo et Juliette is a symphonie dramatique, a large-scale choral symphony by French composer Hector Berlioz, which was first performed on 24 November 1839. The libretto was written by Émile Deschamps, and the completed work was assigned the catalogue numbers Op. 17 and H. 79. It is based on Shakespeare's play Romeo and Juliet; it is regarded as one of Berlioz's finest works, and it is among the most original in form. The score is Berlioz's most comprehensive and detailed programmatic piece.

Composition

Genesis

Initial inspiration came from a performance he witnessed in 1827 of Romeo and Juliet (in David Garrick's edited version) at the Odéon Theatre in Paris. The cast included Harriet Smithson, who also inspired Berlioz's Symphonie fantastique. In his Memoirs, Berlioz describes the electrifying effect of the drama:

... to steep myself in the fiery sun and balmy nights of Italy, to witness the drama of that passion swift as thought, burning as lava, radiantly pure as an angel's glance, imperious, irresistible, the raging vendettas, the desperate kisses, the frantic strife of love and death, was more than I could bear. By the third act, scarcely able to breathe—it was as though an iron hand had gripped me by the heart—I knew that I was lost. I may add that at the time I did not know a word of English; I could only glimpse Shakespeare darkly through the mists of Letourneur's translation; the splendour of the poetry which gives a whole new glowing dimension to his glorious works was lost on me. ... But the power of the acting, especially that of Juliet herself, the rapid flow of the scenes, the play of expression and voice and gesture, told me more and gave me a far richer awareness of the ideas and passions of the original than the words of my pale and garbled translation could do.

The range of feeling and mood as well as poetic and formal invention which Berlioz found in Shakespeare had a strong influence on his music, making a direct musical setting of Shakespeare's work only natural. In fact, he had been planning a musical realisation of Romeo and Juliet for a long time before 1838, but other projects intervened. Emile Deschamps (the librettist of the work) says that he and Berlioz worked out a plan for the symphony shortly after the Odéon's 1827/28 season. Indeed, it may be the case that Roméo et Juliettes genesis is intertwined with other works composed before the composer left for his Prix de Rome sojourn of 1830 to 1832. Sardanapale, the cantata with which Berlioz finally won the Prix de Rome in 1830, puts the melodic material of both the Roméo seul ("Romeo alone") portion of the second movement and the Grande fête chez Capulet ("Great banquet at the Capulets").

There is abundant evidence that Berlioz was gradually working out a scheme for Roméo et Juliette during his sojourn in Italy. He reviewed a February 1831 performance in Florence of Bellini's I Capuleti e i Montecchi, outlining in passing how he would compose music for the Roméo et Juliette story: it would feature, he says, the sword fight, a concert of love, Mercutio's piquant buffooning, the terrible catastrophe, and the solemn oath of the two rival families. One line of text from the review eventually shows up in the libretto of the symphony.

Realization

The eventual composition of Roméo et Juliette as we know it now was made possible by the generous gift of 20,000 francs by Niccolò Paganini; after hearing a performance of Harold en Italie at the Paris Conservatoire on 16 December 1838, the great virtuoso had publicly knelt before Berlioz and hailed him as the heir of Beethoven. Paganini died shortly after, and did not read or hear the piece. Berlioz used the money primarily to repay his debts, and afterwards was still left with "a handsome sum of money", which he used to allow himself to put his full focus towards working on "a really important work", unobstructed by his usual time-consuming obligations as a critic. Berlioz finished the score on 8 September 1839.

The work's libretto is not sourced from the original plays, and as a result contains changes from Shakespeare's play, both in the version Berlioz worked from, and subsequent cuts he and his librettist made. Berlioz's composition was heavily influenced by the play he had seen acted by Charles Kemble and Harriet Smithson in 1827, which had been rewritten by the 18th century actor David Garrick to have Juliet awaken from her deathlike sleep before Romeo's death from (a much slower acting) poison. Berlioz enlisted the services of author Emile Deschamps to write the libretto. Between them they also left out the character of the nurse and expanded Shakespeare's brief mention of the two families' reconciliation into a substantial vocal finale.

Berlioz developed a special predilection for the symphony over his career, writing in his memoirs that one movement in particular became a favorite: "If you now ask me which of my pieces I prefer, my answer will be that I share the view of most artists: I prefer the adagio (the Love Scene) in Romeo and Juliet."

Performance

From composition until the first performance, Berlioz's time was occupied with physical arrangements for the premiere: parts were copied, chorus parts lithographed, and rehearsals got underway. The bass-baritone, Adolphe-Louis Alizard (Friar Lawrence), and the Prologue chorus, all of whom came from the Paris Opéra, were prepared during the intermissions of performances there. There was much anticipation in Paris prior to the first performance. In the rehearsals, Berlioz pioneered the practice of orchestral sectionals, rehearsing the different sections of the orchestra separately to better prepare them for the challenging piece. This was followed by two full orchestra rehearsals to polish up the details.

It was first performed in three concerts conducted by Berlioz at the Paris Conservatoire with an orchestra of 100 instruments and 101 voices on 24 November, 1 December and 15 December 1839, before capacity audiences that comprised much of the Parisian intelligentsia. One notable audience member was Richard Wagner, who would later note the influence of the symphony on his opera Tristan und Isolde. Reactions to the piece were quite varied, as could be expected for a radical work. However, it was widely acknowledged that Berlioz had scored a major triumph in these first performances; a "tour de force such as only my system of sectional rehearsals could have achieved". Berlioz comments: "The work as it was then [in 1839] was performed three times at the Conservatoire under my direction and, each time, appeared to be a genuine success. But I felt at once that much would have to be changed, and I went over it carefully and critically from every point of view." He continued to revise the work, a few instances upon the suggestions of critics, but generally by his own judgement.

A premiere of a later revision (including cuts and changes to the Prologue, Queen Mab Scherzo, and the Finale) was held in Vienna on 2 January 1846, the first performance since 1839 and the first abroad. After hearing a complete performance in Vienna on 26 January 1846, Berlioz took the opportunity to make major revisions before a performance scheduled for the following April in Prague. He accepted advice from several confidants and advisers, rewriting the coda of the Queen Mab Scherzo, shortening Friar Laurence's narrative at the end, deleting a lengthy second Prologue at the beginning of the second half, and introducing musical foreshadowing in the first prologue. The full score was not published until 1847.

Reflecting on the first performances, Berlioz commented in his memoirs:

The work is enormously difficult to perform. It poses problems of every kind, problems inherent in the form and in the style and only to be solved by long and patient rehearsal, impeccably directed. To be well done, it needs first-rate performers—players, singers, conductor—intent on preparing it with as much care as a new opera is prepared in a good opera house, in fact almost as if it were to be performed by heart.

Instrumentation
The score calls for:
piccolo, 2 flutes, 2 oboes (one doubling cor anglais), 2 clarinets, 4 bassoons
4 horns, 2 cornets, 2 trumpets, 3 trombones, bass tuba
2 pairs of timpani, 2 Tambourines, 2 Triangles, bass drum, cymbals, crotales
2 harps and strings
contralto, tenor, bass

Music
Structurally and musically, Roméo et Juliette is most indebted to Beethoven's 9th symphony – not just due to the use of soloists and choir, but in factors such as the weight of the vocal contribution being in the finale, and also in aspects of the orchestration such as the theme of the trombone recitative at the Introduction. The roles of Roméo and Juliette are represented by the orchestra, and the narrative aspects by the voices. Berlioz's reasoning follows:

If, in the famous garden and cemetery scenes, the dialogue of the two lovers, Juliet's asides, and Romeo's passionate outbursts are not sung, if the duets of love and despair are given to the orchestra, the reasons for this are numerous and easy to understand. First, and this reason alone would be sufficient, it is a symphony and not an opera. Second, since duets of this nature have been treated vocally a thousand times by the greatest masters, it was wise as well as unusual to attempt another means of expression.

The vocal forces are used sparingly throughout, until they are fully deployed in the finale. The exceptional virtuosity deployed in the orchestral writing seems particularly appropriate for the dedicatee of the work, Paganini himself, who was never able to hear it, much to Berlioz's regret. Further examples of Berlioz's inventiveness are shown in the use of thematic links throughout the piece, somewhat laying the ground for the Wagnerian leitmotif, for example the last solo notes of the oboe which follow Juliet's suicide echo a phrase from the earlier funeral procession when she was thought to be dead. Berlioz signed and dated his autograph on 8 September 1839. The final score was dedicated to Paganini.

The stylistic links of the work with Beethoven before (and Wagner after) could not be stronger. From Beethoven, Berlioz learned the very notion of programmatic music. He saw in the Pastoral symphony how music might be depictive without being naïve, in the symphonic scherzi how the delicate Queen Mab might best be evoked, and in the 9th symphony how effective a choral finale could be. He sensed Beethoven's flexibility with regard to number of movements and the performing force.

Influence

From Roméo et Juliette Wagner absorbed much about the ideals of dramatic music and the work can be considered a major influence on Tristan und Isolde. When Wagner first heard the work in 1839 he said it made him feel like a schoolboy at Berlioz's side. Roméo et Juliette was also the work of Berlioz's that Wagner knew best. Indeed, their second and last meeting was on the occasion of a performance of the work in London in 1855. Wagner learned something of melodic flexibility and perhaps even a mastery of the orchestral force from Berlioz. Moreover, in 1860, he sent Berlioz the published full score of Tristan und Isolde inscribed merely:

Beyond the influence on Wagner's music drama, the piece pushed the limits of the contemporary orchestra's capabilities, in terms of colour, programmatic scope and individual virtuosity. While this applies to much of Berlioz's music, it is even more true for Roméo et Juliette, written at the height of his powers and ambition. Its vivid scene-setting surpasses many operas, which constitutes an enormous success on Berlioz's part. Franz Liszt also recognised the significance of Berlioz as a progressive composer, and championed his music.

Structure

Part I

Part II

Part III

Recordings

Complete
Roméo et Juliette: Gladys Swarthout, John Garris, Nicola Moscona. Arturo Toscanini cond., NBC Symphony Orchestra. 2 CDs, ADD, RCA Records. Recorded 1947.
Roméo et Juliette: Margaret Roggero, Leslie Chabay, Yi-Kwei Sze. Charles Munch cond., Boston Symphony Orchestra, Harvard Glee Club and Radcliffe Choral Society. RCA Records Victor LP LM 6011; CD reissue RCA/BMG GD 60681. Recorded Boston, 22–23 February 1953.
Roméo et Juliette: Irma Kolassi, Joseph Peyron, Lucien Lovano. Charles Munch cond., Orchestre National et Choœurs de la RTF. 2 CDs, Cascavelle. Live recording, Paris, 25 June 1953.
Roméo et Juliette: Rosalind Elias, Cesare Valletti, Giorgio Tozzi. Boston Symphony Orchestra, New England Conservatory Chorus. RCA Records Victor LP LD 6098; CD reissue RCA/BMG 74321 341682. Recorded Boston, 23–24 April 1961.
Roméo et Juliette: Regina Resnik, André Turp, David Ward. Pierre Monteux cond., London Symphony Orchestra and Chorus. Westminster LP XWN2233; CD reissues Millennium Classics MCAD-29805, DG Westminster 471 2422. Recorded Walthamstow Town Hall, 18–21 June 1962.
Roméo et Juliette: Patricia Kern, Robert Tear, John Shirley-Quirk. Sir Colin Davis cond., London Symphony Orchestra, John Alldis Choir, Philips LP SAL3695-96, CD reissue 416 962.2. Recorded Wembley Town Hall, 24, 27–28 February, 13–14 April 1968.
Roméo et Juliette: Christa Ludwig, Michel Sénéchal, Nicolai Ghiaurov. Lorin Maazel cond. ORTF Choir, Vienna Philharmonic Orchestra, Decca Records SET570-71. Recorded 11–15 December 1972, Sofiensaal, Vienna.
Roméo et Juliette: Julia Hamari, Jean Dupouy, José van Dam. Seiji Ozawa, cond., Boston Symphony Orchestra, New England Conservatory Chorus. 2 CDs. Deutsche Grammophon. Recorded Boston, October 1975.
Roméo et Juliette: Brigitte Fassbaender, Nicolai Gedda, John Shirley-Quirk. Lamberto Gardelli, cond., Austrian Radio Symphony Orchestra and Chorus. Orfeo. Recorded 18–25 February 1983, Musikvereinssaal.
Roméo et Juliette: Olga Borodina, Thomas Moser, Alastair Miles. Colin Davis cond., Wiener Philharmoniker, Bavarian Radio Chorus. 2 CDs, DDD, Philips Classics Records, 1 September 1993.
Roméo et Juliette: Catherine Robbin, Jean-Paul Fouchécourt, Gilles Cachemaille. John Eliot Gardiner cond., Orchestre Révolutionnaire et Romantique, Monteverdi Choir. 2 CDs, DDD, Philips/PolyGram, 14 April 1998.
Roméo et Juliette: Jessye Norman, John Aler, Simon Estes. Riccardo Muti cond., Philadelphia Orchestra, Westminster Choir, New Philharmonia Orchestra. 2 CDs, DDD, EMI Classics, 11 August 1998.
Roméo et Juliette: Daniela Barcellona, Kenneth Tarver, Orlin Anastassov. Colin Davis cond., London Symphony Orchestra. 2 CDs, DDD, LSO Live, 1 January 2000. Cat. no: LSO0003, UPC: 822231100324.
Roméo et Juliette: Melanie Diener, Kenneth Tarver, Denis Sedov. Pierre Boulez cond., Cleveland Orchestra and Chorus. 2 CDs, DDD, Deutsche Grammophon, 14 October 2003.
Roméo et Juliette: Olga Borodina, Kenneth Tarver, Evgeny Nikitin. Valery Gergiev cond., London Symphony Orchestra and Chorus, Guildhall School Singers. 2 CDs, DDD, LSO Live, November 2013. UPC: 822231176220.
Roméo et Juliette: Michèle Losier, Samuel Boden, David Soar. Andrew Davis, cond., BBC Symphony Orchestra, BBC Symphony Chorus. 2 CDs, DDD, Chandos. Recorded 2015.

Excerpts
Roméo et Juliette: André Cluytens, Orchestre du Théâtre National de l'Opéra. CD, Testament, September 1956. Cat. no: SBT1234 .
Roméo et Juliette: Lorin Maazel cond., Berlin Philharmonic Orchestra, Deutsche Grammophone, 1957
Roméo et Juliette: Leonard Bernstein cond., New York Philharmonic. 2 CDs, ADD, Sony, 1963.
Roméo et Juliette: Carlo Maria Giulini cond., Chicago Symphony Orchestra. 2 CDs, ADD, EMI Classics/Angel, 1969.
Roméo et Juliette: Yoav Talmi cond., San Diego Symphony Orchestra, San Diego Master Chorale. CD, DDD, Naxos, 19–20 November 1994. Cat. no: 8.553195.

DVD
Roméo et Juliette: Hanna Schwarz, Philip Langridge, Peter Meven. Colin Davis cond., Bavarian Radio Symphony Orchestra. DVD, Arthaus Musik, 21 March 2006. Cat. no: 102017

References
Notes

Cited sources
Berlioz, Hector; Cairns, David, (trans. and editor) (2002). The Memoirs of Hector Berlioz. New York: Alfred A. Knopf. .
Cairns, David (1999). Berlioz. Volume Two. Servitude and Greatness 1832–1869. London: Allen Lane. The Penguin Press. .
Holoman, D. Kern (1989). Berlioz, p. 201. Cambridge, Massachusetts: Harvard University Press. .

Macdonald, Hugh (1982). Berlioz, The Master Musicians Series. London: J. M. Dent. .

Further reading
Albright, Daniel (2001), Berlioz's Semi-Operas: Roméo et Juliette and La damnation de Faust, 204pp, University of Rochester Press.

External links

Choral symphonies
Compositions by Hector Berlioz
Berlioz, Romeo et Juliette
Works based on Romeo and Juliet
1839 compositions
Music based on works by William Shakespeare